Fulda coroller is a species of butterfly in the family Hesperiidae. It is found on Madagascar. The habitat consists of forests, forest margins and cleared forests.

References

Butterflies described in 1833
Astictopterini